Azilises (Greek:  ,   (epigraphic); Kharosthi:) was an Indo-Scythian king who ruled in the area of Gandhara circa 57-35 BCE.

Name
Azes's name is attested on his coins in the Greek form  and the Kharosthi form , which are both derived from the Saka name , meaning "commander-in-chief".

Coinage
Azilises issued some joint coins with Azes, where Azes is presented as king on the obverse (ΒΑΣΙΛΕΩΣ ΒΑΣΙΛΕΩΝ ΜΕΓΑΛΟΥ ΑΖΙΛΙΣΟΥ), and Azilises is introduced as king on the obverse in kharoshthi ("Maharajasa rajarajasa mahatasa Ayilisasa", "The great king, the king of kings, the great Azilises").

See also
Yuezhi
Greco-Bactrian Kingdom
Indo-Greek Kingdom
Indo-Parthian Kingdom
Kushan Empire

References

Sources 
 
 The Shape of Ancient Thought. Comparative studies in Greek and Indian Philosophies by Thomas McEvilley (Allworth Press and the School of Visual Arts, 2002) 
 The Greeks in Bactria and India, W.W. Tarn, Cambridge University Press.

External links
 Coins of Azilises

Indo-Scythian kings
1st-century BC rulers in Asia
1st-century BC Iranian people